Fukui Prefectural Fujishima High School (福井県立藤島高等学校, Fukui Kenritsu Fujishima Kōtō Gakkō) is a high school in Fukui, Japan, founded in 1855. The school is operated by the Fukui Prefectural Board of Education. In 2004 the school was chosen as SSH.

Its best known graduate is probably Yoichiro Nambu, winner of the 2008 Nobel Prize in Physics.

History

The history of Fujishima High School can be traced back to the han school of Fukui Domain,  established in 1855.

Notable alumni
Hirase Sakugorō - botanist
Yoichiro Nambu - physicist, Nobel laureate
Keisuke Okada - admiral in the Imperial Japanese Navy and the 31st Prime Minister of Japan
Machi Tawara - modern poet
Chosei Komatsu - orchestral conductor
Yuichi Nakagaichi - former volleyball player

See also
List of high schools in Fukui Prefecture

External links
 Official Fujishima High School Website

High schools in Fukui Prefecture
Schools in Fukui Prefecture
Educational institutions established in 1855
1855 establishments in Japan
Fukui (city)